Sutton Coldfield Town Hall is a former hotel and council building in Sutton Coldfield, Birmingham, England. The building is Grade A locally listed.

History

Background
A moot hall was built in Sutton Coldfield during the time of John Vesey, Bishop of Exeter, at a site at the top of Mill Street. It was demolished following structural instability caused by the collapse of an upper floor due to the weight of crowds attending the funeral of Thomas Dawney in 1671. There were no fatalities or serious injuries. A second moot hall was constructed on the same site soon after demolition. It remained in use up until 1854 when it too became structurally unsafe resulting in its demolition. The decision was taken for the workhouse and gaol to be renovated and turned into municipal offices. This was rebuilt in 1859 to better suit its purpose. The buildings were converted into a masonic hall upon the opening of the new town hall. The almshouses beneath the building were removed in 1924 and the occupants moved to newly constructed almshouses in Walmley, in the southern area of Sutton Coldfield.

Current building

The current building has its origins in the Royal Hotel which was built in 1865 on a small hill above the newly opened railway station to serve the needs of visitors to the town. Throughout its short life, the hotel was beset with financial difficulties and closed in 1895. Lieutenant Colonel Wilkinson purchased the hotel in 1896 and converted it for use as a sanatorium, but it was subsequently acquired by the Sutton Corporation for £9,000 in December 1901. The old town hall, in Mill Street, was sold in February 1903 and the Corporation began an ambitious extension to the former hotel to provide a purpose built town hall comprising council chambers, assembly rooms and a fire station. The extension was completed at a cost of £10,000, and although the fire headquarters opened a few months earlier, the main part of the extension was opened by the Mayor, Councillor R. H. Sadler, as Sutton Coldfield Town Hall on 19 September 1906.

The opening event was an evening concert by the Sutton Coldfield Choral Society. The following night, an amateur dramatic performance of The Duke of Killicrankie was given by A. C. Fraser Wood and Company. All operations were moved from the previous town hall on Mill Street to the new building. The area to the front of the town hall, King Edwards Square, became the main public assembly area and the stocks, which are now located at Blakesley Hall, were displayed to the public in the square.

When first opened, the clock tower, which rises from one of the main entrances, also served as a hose tower and a ventilation shaft for the fire headquarters.

Sutton Coldfield Town Hall ceased to be the seat of local government, after the Municipal Borough of Sutton Coldfield was absorbed into the City of Birmingham as part of the implementation of the Local Government Act 1972.

In September 2012, Birmingham City Council offered the adjoining council house portion of the building for sale. In May 2014, it was announced that this part of the building had been sold to Gethar Ventures, and would be converted into 18 residential apartments, with a further 35 apartments and two restaurants built on adjacent land.

The Town Hall itself remained under the ownership of Birmingham City Council as a public arts venue. In 2016, a group of local arts, history & events professionals formed a charitable trust registered as the Sutton Coldfield Arts and Recreational Trust. Through this time, the trust operated as tenants of the building to Birmingham City Council.

After a successful three years of operating the venue, Birmingham City Council formally exchanged ownership of the building to the newly renamed trust, Royal Sutton Coldfield Community Town Hall Trust. Since 2019 the trust has held legal ownership of the building, and continues to operate the business inside it.

War memorial
Standing outside the town hall in King Edward Square is a war memorial commemorating those who died in World War I. Unveiled on 1 November 1922, it consists of single 1.8 metre bronze figure on a 4.6 metre Dalbeattie granite pedestal. Inscribed in the pedestal is:
Erected to the glorious memory of the men of Sutton Coldfield who gave their lives in the Great War 1914-1919; and they died that we may live.

The memorial was subject to debate immediately after the war. The design by Francis-Doyle Jones was selected by the Sutton Coldfield District Council committee in November 1919 and he promised not to produce a model like it anywhere else in Warwickshire and in only two other locations in the rest of the United Kingdom. The cost of the memorial was met by the Voluntary Subscription Fund. Doyle-Jones had prepared his clay model by March 1922 and the bronze figure was completed on by July 1922. Doyle-Jones was paid £1,650. The memorial was intended to be unveiled on 31 August 1922, however, delays caused by the stonemason set this date back to 1 November. The memorial was restored in 1979.

References

External links
Image of Town Hall

Buildings and structures in Birmingham, West Midlands
Theatres in Birmingham, West Midlands
City and town halls in the West Midlands (county)
Government buildings completed in 1865
Sutton Coldfield